The 2012 Black Reel Awards, which annually recognize and celebrate the achievements of black people in feature, independent and television films, took place in Washington, D.C. on February 9, 2012. While the film Pariah had the most nominations with nine, The Help was the big winner taking home six out of the seven awards for which it was nominated. Attack the Block and  Shame were also multiple winners, with each winning two awards. Octavia Spencer, Viola Davis and Steve McQueen also won two awards apiece.

Winners and nominees
Winners are listed first and highlighted in bold.

References

}
2012 in American cinema
2012 awards in the United States
Black Reel Awards
2011 film awards